How Sweet to Be an Idiot is the first solo album by Neil Innes, formerly of the Bonzo Dog Doo-Dah Band, and was released in 1973.

Release 
The title track was released as a single (with B-side "The Age of Desperation") but failed to chart. It was a more instrumented version than on the album, arranged by Richard Hewson. Its melody was borrowed by Oasis for their single "Whatever", released in 1994; Innes claimed plagiarism and as a result received royalties and a co-writing credit.

The album was re-released by United Artists in 1980 under the title Neil Innes A-Go-Go and by EMI in 1994 with additional tracks – most of which had been released on singles – under the title Re-Cycled Vinyl Blues. This edition of the album was dedicated to Ollie Halsall, who had died in 1992, and former Bonzo Dog bassist Dennis Cowan, who had died in 1972; it featured a guest appearance by Michael Palin on the title track.

Innes later said of this time the album was recorded, Innes performed the title song on Monty Python Live at the Hollywood Bowl and on Monty Python Live at Drury Lane. Surviving members of Monty Python performed the song for Terry Jones's funeral at Golders Green Cemetery.

Reception 
Stewart Mason, reviewing the album for Allmusic, described it as "split between tongue-in-cheek parody and straight pop songs" and containing "solidly melodic Beatlesque pop", but was critical of the "unfortunate sterility to Innes' self-production".

A review of the release by Mark Deming of Allmusic was more appreciative than that of his predecessor, saying that "most [of the tracks] walk a graceful tightrope between sly humor and solid pop-friendly rock & roll" and recommending that "anyone who digs a great hook played with heart should get to know the music of Neil Innes".

Track listing
All songs written by Neil Innes
How Sweet to Be an Idiot and Neil Innes-A-Go-Go have identical track listings

Side one
 "Prologue" – 0:49
 "Momma Bee" – 2:47*
 "Immortal Invisible" – 4:04*
 "Topless A-Go-Go" – 4:08
 "Feel No Shame" – 6:12

Side two
 "How Sweet To Be An Idiot" – 2:45
 "Dream On" – 3:04 [listed as "Dream" on Neil Innes-A-Go-Go]
 "L'Amour Perdu" – 2:10
 "Song For Yvonne" – 2:52*
 "This Love of Ours" – 2:57*
 "Singing A Song Is Easy" – 5:08

Track listing for Re-Cycled Vinyl Blues
 "Re-Cycled Vinyl Blues" – 3:33
 "Angelina" – 2:50
 "Come Out into the Open" – 3:42
 "Prologue" – 0:51
 "Momma Bee" – 2:54
 "Lie Down and Be Counted" – 3:09
 "Immortal Invisible" – 4:12
 "Age of Desperation" – 2:34
 "Topless-A-Go-Go" – 4:04
 "Feel No Shame" – 6:24
 "How Sweet To Be an Idiot" – 2:51
 "Dream On" – 3:05
 "L'Amour Perdu" – 2:17
 "Song for Yvonne" – 2:57
 "This Love of Ours" – 3:04
 "Fluff on the Needle" – 5:36
 "Singing a Song Is Easy" – 5:04
 "Bandwagon" (Live) – 4:31

Personnel
 Neil Innes – vocals, guitar, piano
 Andy Roberts – rhythm guitar
 Mike Kellie – drums
 Dave Richards – bass guitar
 Ollie Halsall – lead guitar, organ
 Gerry Conway – drums on *
 The Mucrons – backing vocals
 Dennis Cowan – guitar on additional tracks for re-release

Notes

External links 
Neill Innes Solo albums page

1973 debut albums
United Artists Records albums
EMI Records albums
Neil Innes albums
Albums produced by Neil Innes